Behzad Gholampour (born December 23, 1966) is a retired Iranian football and futsal goalkeeper. He was the goalkeeping trainer for Iran national football team from 2008 until late March 2009.

Honours
Pas Tehran
 Asian Club Championship: 1992–93

Iran

 Asian Games: 1990
 Asian Games: 1998

References

External links
 

 
Hamshahri 

1966 births
Living people
Futsal goalkeepers
Iranian footballers
Iran international footballers
Iranian men's futsal players
Iranian football managers
Saipa F.C. players
Pas players
Esteghlal F.C. players
Asian Games gold medalists for Iran
1992 AFC Asian Cup players
People from Masjed Soleyman
Asian Games medalists in football
Footballers at the 1990 Asian Games
Footballers at the 1994 Asian Games
Footballers at the 1998 Asian Games
Persepolis F.C. non-playing staff
Association football goalkeepers
Medalists at the 1990 Asian Games
Medalists at the 1998 Asian Games
Association football goalkeeping coaches
Sportspeople from Khuzestan province
20th-century Iranian people
21st-century Iranian people